Professor (Dr.) Srikrishna Deva Rao is the Vice Chancellor of [NALSAR University of Law, Hyderabad] and an eminent teacher and scholar in criminal law and access to justice.

Education
Rao gained a master's degree in Law from Kakatiya University, Warangal, a Master of Philosophy in Law from National Law School of India University, Bangalore and a PhD from Delhi University.

Career
Rao has previously been the Vice-Chancellor of National Law University Odisha (2014 - 2020), Registrar of National Law University Delhi (2010 - 2014), Founding Director of School of Law, IGNOU (2007 - 2010), and Dean of the Gujarat National Law University (2004 - 2007). 

Rao’s areas of specialisation are criminal law, juvenile justice, human rights and clinical legal education. In his over three decades-long academic career, in addition to NLU Delhi, NLU Odisha and GNLU, he has taught at NLSIU, NALSAR and the University of Delhi.

Rao has been instrumental in institutionalizing legal aid and legal empowerment in India. The Land Rights Paralegal Programme of Andhra Pradesh state was an offshoot of his course on Legal Aid and Public Interest Litigation at NALSAR, Hyderabad in 2003. He developed a specialized Diploma in Paralegal Practice at Indira Gandhi National Open University in 2009 during his tenure as Director of the School of Law at New Delhi. He also initiated the Bachelor of Vocational program in Access to Justice at NLU Odisha. Professor Rao was also a Member of the Committee of National Legal Services Authority (NALSA) in 2018 to design the curriculum for four mandatory clinical courses. 

Rao has been engaged in human rights teaching and research and was sponsored by the National Human Rights Commission in 1994 to participate in Human Rights Course at International Institute of Human Rights, Strasbourg, France and later also interned with the International Committee of Red Cross, Geneva.

Rao is currently the Chairperson of the Committee for Reforms in Criminal Law, constituted by the Ministry of Home Affairs, Government of India to recommend reforms in the India’s criminal laws in a principled, effective and efficient manner.

Rao is a Fulbright Scholar and has been a visiting fellow at the University of Washington and the School of Oriental and African Studies. He was a Ford Foundation Fellow at the Centre for Culture, Media and Governance, Jamia Millia Islamia. He is a recipient of the Kumarappa-Reckless, the highest award of the India Society of Criminology (ISC) for his contribution to teaching, research and administration in criminal justice education and has also received the Dr. B. S. Haikerwal and Prof. Sushil Chandra Award from ISC.

The Supreme Court of India in DK Basu v. State of West Bengal, (1997) 1 SCC 416 borrowed some of his ideas and observations on custodial deaths from his article, Let us speak for the Dead and Protect the Living published in 1995.

Rao is currently a Standing Committee member of the Legal Education Committee of the Bar Council of India. He has previously been a member of the UGC Expert Committee in Law to Transform Legal Education in India. He was also a member of the Ministry of Law and Justice Committee for implementing Judicial Impact Assessment in India.

He has undertaken several research projects with the Law Commission of India, Ministry of Law and Justice, United Nations Children’s Emergency Fund (UNICEF), United Nations Development Programme (UNDP), International Labour Organization (ILO), UK-India Education and Research Initiative (UKERI), Indian Medical Association and Sir Dorabji Tata Trust.

Awards

Indian Society of Criminology Award for Senior Social Scientist, Dr. Haikerwal and Prof. Sushil Chandra Award by ISC, Chennai, 2015
ICSSR Research Grant for project on "Exploring Changing Dynamics of Children's laws in India in Post Liberalization Era" (2016–18)
Ford Foundation Research Fellow at Centre for Culture, Media and Governance (CCMG), Jamia Millia Islamia, New Delhi (2011–12)

Selected publications
Srikrishna Deva Rao (2013). Paralegal Education in India: Problems and Prospects, Journal of National Law University, Delhi 1: 94–105 
Srikrishna Deva Rao (2013). Mapping of media law curriculum related to legal education in India

Initiatives
At National Law University Odisha Rao has taken several initiatives to strengthen the teaching–learning process and research.
The NAAC Self Study Report of NLUO mentions some of his initiatives at NLUO
The University has set up Community College in 2016 under the UGC Scheme to prepare "barefoot lawyers" to strengthen the justice delivery system in India.
The Project on Access to Justice is another initiative of the University supported by Department of Justice, Ministry of Law & Justice, Government of India and UNDP. Under this Project, the University has set up three village Legal Aid Clinics in Dompada village in Cuttack, Jankia in Khurda and Brahmagiri in Puri district. These Village Legal Aid Clinics are intended to improve access to justice in marginalised communities.
NLUO will have faculty exchange and joint research with globally reputed institutions. 
An MOU with National Institute of Securities Markets (NISM) has been signed in November 2016. The MOU is designed to foster academics and research between the two institutes, thereby promoting capacity building in securities markets both in training and employment. 
Another MoU has been signed between Competition Commission of India (CCI) and NLUO
NLUO has recently been accredited by NAAC at A Grade

References

Living people
Year of birth missing (living people)
Scholars from Odisha
20th-century Indian lawyers
21st-century Indian lawyers
Delhi University alumni